Bellini is an Italian surname, formed as a patronymic or plural form of Bellino.

People
Family of Italian painters:
Jacopo Bellini (c. 1396–c. 1470), father of Gentile and Giovanni
Gentile Bellini (c. 1429–1507)
Giovanni Bellini (c. 1430–1516), the most famous of the three
Adriano Bellini (born 1942), known as Kirk Morris, Italian former bodybuilder and actor
Andrea Bellini, Italian operatic bass, active in nineteenth century
Andrea Bellini, Italian contemporary art curator
Barb Bellini (born 1977), retired Canadian female volleyball player
Bellino Bellini (1741–1799), Italian painter
Claudio Bellini (born 1963), Italian architect and designer
David Bellini (1972–2016), Italian screenwriter, television writer, story editor and docu-director
Delfo Bellini (1900–1953), Italian football player 
Elma Bellini (1954–2018), American judge
Filippo Bellini (fl. 1594), Italian painter
Francesco Bellini (born 1947), Canadian entrepreneur
Giacinto Bellini (17th century), Italian painter 
Gianfranco Bellini (1924–2006), Italian actor and voice actor
Giancarlo Bellini (born 1945), Italian former road bicycle racer
Gianmarco Bellini (born 1958), Italian Air Force officer 
Gianpaolo Bellini (born 1980) an Italian football player
Hilderaldo Bellini (1930–2014), Brazilian football player, captain of the first Brazilian team to win the FIFA World Cup
Isa Bellini (1922–2021), Italian actress
Italo Bellini (1915–1965), Italian sports shooter
Jarrett Bellini (born 1978),  American writer
Jason Bellini, American journalist
Lorenzo Bellini (1643–1704), Italian physician and anatomist
Mario Bellini (born 1935), Italian architect
Mark Bellini (born 1964), former American football wide receiver in the National Football League 
Mattia Bellini (born 1994), Italian rugby union player
Paul Bellini (born 1963), Canadian comedy writer and television actor
Raffaello Bellini (1874–1930), Italian zoologist
Santiago Bellini Noya (born 1996), Uruguayan football player
Savino Bellini (1913–1974), Italian footballer 
Vincenzo Bellini (1801–1835), Italian opera composer

References

Surnames of Italian origin
Italian-language surnames